Christine O'Malley is an American film producer and documentary filmmaker.

Film career 
In 2005, O'Malley and her husband Patrick Creadon produced their first feature-length documentary, Wordplay. Wordplay premiered at the 2006 Sundance Film Festival. O’Malley has since produced or executive produced more than twenty feature-length documentary films.

Filmography (partial list) 

In addition to her producing work, O'Malley has worked in many different roles throughout the film industry. She served on the Sundance Women in Film Committee, founded the nonprofit Story into Action with producer Neal Baer, and in 2014 was the director of AFI Docs, the documentary film festival run by the American Film Institute in Washington, D.C. In 2019, O'Malley was invited to join the Academy of Motion Picture Arts and Sciences.

References 

1972 births
Living people
American film producers
American documentary film producers
DePaul University alumni
Columbia College Chicago alumni